Sean Boyd (born 10 March 1978) is an Australian water polo player who competed in the 2000 Summer Olympics

References

External links
 

1978 births
Living people
Australian male water polo players
Olympic water polo players of Australia
Water polo players at the 2000 Summer Olympics